Galbarwaaqo is a district town located in central Mudug, Somalia.

Galbarwaaqo is located about 90 miles from Gaalkacayo, Galmudug State. Its population is about 2,000. Galbarwaaqo lies near a large valley area known as Gaanbe Laasood.

References

Populated places in Mudug